The N-5 or National Highway 5 is a 1819 km national highway in Pakistan, which extends from Karachi in Sindh to Torkham in Khyber Pakhtunkhwa.

Route 

The N-5 is the longest national highway in Pakistan and serves as an important north–south road artery, starting from Karachi and extending through Hyderabad, Moro and Sukkur in Sindh before crossing into Punjab province where it passes through Multan, Sahiwal, Lahore, Gujranwala, Gujrat, Jhelum and Rawalpindi. At Rawalpindi, it turns westwards and passes through Attock Khurd before crossing the Indus River into Khyber Pakhtunkhwa to continue through Nowshera and Peshawar before entering the Khyber Pass and reaching the border town of Torkham in the FATA. Its total length is divided into 1021 km in Punjab, 671 km in Sindh, and 165 km in Khyber Pakhtunkhwa. It is managed by the National Highway Authority.

History 

Part of the highway was built on the ancient Grand Trunk Road (commonly known as G.T. Road) which came under jurisdiction of the new state after the independence of Pakistan in 1947. The historical Grand Trunk Route extended from Wagha, Punjab to Peshawar, Khyber Pakhtunkhwa.
The original highways were Peshawar-Torkham Road,  Grand Trunk Road (Peshawar-Lahore), Lahore-Multan Road, Multan-Bahawalpur Road,  KLP Road (Bahawal Pur-Rahim Yar Khan), Karachi-Rahim Yar Khan Road.

Junctions and interchanges

Sindh

Punjab

Khyber Pakhtunkhwa

FATA

Electronic Toll & Traffic Management (ETTM)

There are Eleven (11) Electronic Toll & Traffic Management (ETTM) System Based Toll Plazas of National Highways.

References

External links
Official website of National Highway Authority

AH1
Roads in Pakistan
Roads in Punjab, Pakistan
Roads in Khyber Pakhtunkhwa
Roads in Sindh